Danila De Lucia (born 3 December 1961) is an Italian politician and journalist. She was a member of the Senate of the Republic for the Five Star Movement between 2018 and 2022.

Biography 
De Lucia was born on 3 December 1961 in Benevento. She works as a journalist and the editor of Messaggio d'oggi.

Political career 
She received 114,051 votes, or 44.5%, defeating her nearest opponent, Alessandrina Lonardo of Forza Italia, by 30,000 votes. She was a member of the 7th permanent commission on public education and cultural heritage, the parliamentary commission investigating feminicide and other forms of gender-based violence and the parliamentary committee on regional issues. She was the first signatory on laws regarding the attribution of surnames to children, on the right to study at university, the declaration of the Arch of Trajan in Benevento as a national monument and the establishment of a National Perinatal and Infant Death Awareness Day.

References

External links 

 

Living people
1961 births
Senators of Legislature XVIII of Italy
Five Star Movement politicians
People from Benevento
21st-century Italian women politicians
20th-century Italian women
Women members of the Senate of the Republic (Italy)